Mocksville is a town in Davie County, North Carolina, United States. The population was 5,900 at the 2020 census. I-40 leads west to Statesville and Hickory, and east to Winston-Salem and Greensboro. Route 64 heads east to Lexington, and west towards Statesville and Taylorsville. It is the county seat of Davie County.

History
Mocksville was incorporated as a town in 1839. The town was named for the original owner of the town site.

George E. Barnhardt House, Boxwood Lodge, Cana Store and Post Office, Jesse Clement House, Cooleemee, Davie County Courthouse, Davie County Jail, Downtown Mocksville Historic District, Hinton Rowan Helper House, Hodges Business College, McGuire-Setzer House, North Main Street Historic District, and Salisbury Street Historic District are listed on the National Register of Historic Places.

Geography and geology
Mocksville is located south of the center of Davie County. U.S. Routes 64 and 601 pass through the town, while U.S. Route 158 has its western terminus in the town center. US 64 leads east  to Lexington and west  to Statesville, while US 601 leads north  to Yadkinville and south  to Salisbury. US 158 leads northeast  to Winston-Salem.

Located in Mocksville is the Mocksville complex that is made up of metamorphosed and unmetamorphosed gabbros including Farmington Gabbro

Climate

According to the Köppen Climate Classification system, Mocksville has a humid subtropical climate, abbreviated "Cfa" on climate maps.

Demographics

2020 census

As of the 2020 United States census, there were 5,900 people, 2,062 households, and 1,307 families residing in the town.

2000 census
As of the census of 2000, there were 4,178 people, 1,627 households, and 1,067 families residing in the town. The population density was 607.2 people per square mile (234.5/km2). There were 1,781 housing units at an average density of 258.8 per square mile (99.9/km2). The racial makeup of the town was 76.14% White, 17.76% African American, 0.19% Native American, 0.67% Asian, 0.05% Pacific Islander, 3.83% from other races, and 1.36% from two or more races. Hispanic or Latino of any race were 8.07% of the population.

There were 1,627 households, out of which 30.4% had children under the age of 18 living with them, 46.7% were married couples living together, 14.6% had a female householder with no husband present, and 34.4% were non-families. 30.7% of all households were made up of individuals, and 14.8% had someone living alone who was 65 years of age or older. The average household size was 2.42 and the average family size was 2.97.

In the town, the population was well distributed by age, with 23.5% under the age of 18, 8.9% from 18 to 24, 27.7% from 25 to 44, 21.4% from 45 to 64, and 18.6% who were 65 years of age or older. The median age was 37 years. For every 100 females, there were 90.3 males. For every 100 females age 18 and over, there were 83.3 males.

The median income for a household in the town was $35,407, and the median income for a family was $42,357. Males had a median income of $31,540 versus $23,375 for females. The per capita income for the town was $18,703. About 9.3% of families and 12.6% of the population were below the poverty line, including 12.8% of those under age 18 and 14.3% of those age 65 or over.

Notable people
 Daniel Boone, lived near Mocksville 1750–66. His father, Squire Boone Sr., was the Justice of the Peace for Mocksville. Squire Boone and his wife Sarah are buried in Mocksville's Joppa Cemetery.
 Clint Bowyer, NASCAR Driver, currently residing in Mocksville, originally from Emporia, Kansas
 Thomas Ferebee, bombardier on the Enola Gay during the bombing of Hiroshima 
 Joe Gibbs, NFL coach, member of Pro Football Hall of Fame, and NASCAR team owner
 Bob Gosse, film producer and director
 Hinton Rowan Helper, abolitionist and author of The Impending Crisis of the South. His residence in Mocksville, Hinton Rowan Helper House, is now a monument.
 Julia C. Howard, member of the North Carolina General Assembly
 Caleb Martin, NBA player
 Cody Martin, NBA player
 Whit Merrifield, MLB player
 Andrew Brock, former Senator and running for Davie County Clerk of Court

References

"The History of Mocksville." historicdowntownmocksville.com - Retrieved Oct. 8, 2013.

External links
 Town of Mocksville official website
 Historic Downtown Mocksville

County seats in North Carolina
Towns in Davie County, North Carolina
Populated places established in 1839
Towns in North Carolina
1839 establishments in North Carolina